DIEGO is a furniture store with 157 furniture stores as of March 2018 available in Hungary (with 97 stores), Romania (with 34 stores), Slovakia (with 20 stores), and the Czech Republic (with 1 store). It sells mainly carpets, PVCs, laminated floors, and curtains.

History 
In 1995, DIEGO started as a small company selling carpets. With spreading around the country, DIEGO started to work in a franchise system. DIEGO mainly focused on carpets, PVCs, and laminated floors. For a bigger service, DIEGO introduced curtains to its selection in 2005, so the company became a furniture store. In 2010, DIEGO introduced wallpapers to its selection.

Own brands 
DIEGO has own brands since the very beginning. Woodstep is a company of DIEGO working with laminated floors, Tulipo is a company working with carpets. DIEGO has also plans for a new brand focusing on carpets.

References 

Furniture companies of Hungary
Hungarian brands